The Governors' Cup or Governor's Cup can refer to:

Professional sports
 Governors' Cup, the baseball trophy awarded to the champion club of the International League
 Governor's Cup (Florida), awarded to the victor of the season series between the Tampa Bay Lightning and Florida Panthers hockey teams
 Governor's Cup Stakes, a Standardbred horse race alternating between racetracks in the United States and Canada
 Governor's Cup (Missouri), awarded to the victor of the Kansas City Chiefs and St. Louis Rams of the National Football League
 Governor's Cup (Texas), awarded to the victor of the Houston Texans and Dallas Cowboys of the National Football League
 Governor's Cup, the original name of the Nigerian FA Cup, the national football (soccer) cup in Nigeria
 Governor's Cup, an International Junior Match Racing Regatta in Newport Beach, California hosted by the Balboa Yacht Club
 Governor's Cup, an off-shore yacht race (and the first prize) between Cape Town and Saint Helena island
 PBA Governors' Cup, a basketball tournament held in the Philippines islands

College sports
 Governor's Cup, the name of the Mississippi State–Ole Miss baseball rivalry since 2007
 Governor's Cup (Alaska), an ice hockey series hosted annually by Alaska and Alaska Anchorage
 Governor's Cup (Kansas), awarded to the victor of the football game between the Kansas State Wildcats and University of Kansas clubs
 Governor's Cup (Kentucky), awarded to the victor of the football game between the Kentucky Wildcats and University of Louisville clubs
 Governor's Cup (Massachusetts), awarded to the victor of the Commonwealth Classic basketball game between the Boston College and University of Massachusetts Amherst teams
 Governor's Cup (New York), an ice hockey tournament hosted annually by Union College and Rensselaer Polytechnic Institute
 Governor's Cup (Rhode Island), awarded to the victor of the football game between the Brown University and University of Rhode Island teams
 Governor's Cup, awarded to the victor of the football game nicknamed Clean, Old-Fashioned Hate between Georgia Institute of Technology and the University of Georgia
 Governor's Cup, awarded to the victor of the men's soccer game between University of Wisconsin–Madison and University of Wisconsin–Milwaukee
 Indiana National Guard Governor's Cup, for several varsity sports between Indiana University and Purdue University

Other
 Governor's Cup (academics), an academic tournament in the state of Kentucky
 Governor's Cup, awarded to the team cooking the best cuisine at the International Bar-B-Q Festival in Owensboro, Kentucky